Riggend is a hamlet in North Lanarkshire, Scotland.
It is on the A73 Stirling Road not far from Wattston.

References

External links

visione.co.uk

Villages in North Lanarkshire
Airdrie, North Lanarkshire